Willie Williams (September 12, 1931 – February 27, 2019) was an American sprinter who set the 100 metres world record in 1956 with a new time of 10.1s, one-tenth of a second faster than the record held jointly by 8 men.

Biography 
Williams grew up in Gary, Indiana, attending Roosevelt High School where he played football and was first in the state in the 100m as a senior. He attended the University of Illinois, from which he gained a degree in physical education. He was in the U.S. army in special services when he broke the world record at the International Military Track Meet in West Berlin in August 1956. He left the army later that year, and became athletics director at Ogden Park, Chicago, before teaching and coaching sports in his home town. He became head track coach at West Side High School, then in 1982 returned to the University of Illinois to coach track. Although he trained the Saudi Arabian Olympic track team in the summer of 1988 for the Seoul Olympics, he declined the opportunity to move to Saudi Arabia and stayed with Illinois, becoming associate head coach in 1997 before retiring in 2000.

He resided in Urbana, Illinois.  Williams died on February 27, 2019, at the age of 87.

References

External links
 Willie Williams on FightingIllini.com

American male sprinters
World record setters in athletics (track and field)
Sportspeople from Gary, Indiana
1931 births
2019 deaths
Track and field athletes from Indiana
University of Illinois alumni
African-American male track and field athletes
Athletes (track and field) at the 1955 Pan American Games
Pan American Games medalists in athletics (track and field)
Pan American Games gold medalists for the United States
Pan American Games bronze medalists for the United States
Medalists at the 1955 Pan American Games
20th-century African-American sportspeople
21st-century African-American people